Ivano Edalini (born 20 August 1961) is an Italian former alpine skier.

Career
Born in Zug, Switzerland he competed under Italian flag. He made his World Cup debut in February 1982. He won two World Cup races, one parallel and one slalom and has been on 4 World Cup podiums in total. On January 6, 1986, he won his first World Cup parallel slalom race in Vienna, Austria and slalom in Madonna di Campiglio in December 1986.

World Cup

Race podiums
1 win – (1 SL)
3 podiums – (3 SL)

Note: On 6 January 1986 he won parallel slalom in Vienna, which counted for Nations Cup only.

References

External links
 
 

1961 births
Living people
Italian male alpine skiers
People from Zug
Sportspeople from the canton of Zug